Keep My Shit Clean (stylized as Keep My Sh*t Clean) is the fifth studio album by American rapper and producer Sean Merrick and his first album under his alias Jacky Jasper. It was released on March 12, 2002 via Number 6 Records and was produced by Phil Cole, H-Bomb and Marc Live. The album featured guest appearances from Kool Keith, Ice-T, Chino XL, Roger Troutman, Dee Bombshell and Trigger Tha Gambler. It peaked at number 60 on the Billboard Top R&B/Hip-Hop Albums chart and number 24 on the Independent Albums chart.

Track listing

Personnel 
 Sean Merrick – main artist, producer
 Keith Matthew Thornton – featured artist (tracks: 4, 16)
 Tracy Lauren Marrow – featured artist (track 3)
 Derek Keith Barbosa – featured artist (track 9)
 Roger Troutman – featured artist (track 8)
 Dee Bombshell – featured artist (track 5)
 Tawan Smith – featured artist (track 9)
 Phillip Cole – producer 
 Marc Giveand – co-producer (tracks: 11, 13, 16)
 Jade Scott Santos – mixing & mastering
 Craig McConnell – mixing

Charts

References 

2002 albums